Joar Leifseth Ulsom  (born 1987) is a Norwegian dog musher.

He was born in Mo i Rana in the county of Nordland.

In March 2018 he won the Iditarod Trail Sled Dog Race in Alaska.

Participation in Iditarod

References

External links 
Ulsom's Iditarod profile

1987 births
Living people
People from Mo i Rana
Norwegian dog mushers
Iditarod champions
Sportspeople from Nordland